Hamilton is an unincorporated community in Jackson Township, Madison County, Indiana.

History
Hamilton was founded in 1836.

Geography

References

Unincorporated communities in Madison County, Indiana
Unincorporated communities in Indiana
Indianapolis metropolitan area